The 2017 Highland Council election was held on 4 May 2017 to elect members of the Highland Council. The election used the 21 wards created under the Local Governance (Scotland) Act 2004; each ward elected three or four councillors using the single transferable vote system (a form of proportional representation). A total of 74 councillors were elected, six less than in 2012.

The election was fought in new wards, as the recommendations by the Boundary Commission had been accepted by Scottish Ministers. There were big changes, particularly in Caithness where an entire ward was removed. This election was most notable for returning 10 Conservative councillors: the party's first representation on the council since 1999.

After the 2012 election an administration had been formed by the Scottish National Party, the Scottish Liberal Democrats and the Scottish Labour Party. This was the first time that the Independents had not had any role in the administration of the council. However, later in the 2012–17 term, this administration fell and the Independent group instead governed as a minority.

After the 2017 election, the Independent, Liberal Democrat and Labour groups formed a coalition administration.

Election result

Note: "Votes" are the first preference votes. The net gain/loss and percentage changes relate to the result of the previous Scottish local elections on 3 May 2012. This may differ from other published sources showing gain/loss relative to seats held at dissolution of Scotland's councils. These are also direct comparisons of seat change, not comparisons to 'notional' results as used in the national results, as such there is a net loss of six seats in the Net gain/loss column.

Ward results

North, West and Central Sutherland
2012: 1 SNP; 1 Lib Dem; 1 Independent
2017: 1 SNP; 1 Lib Dem; 1 Independent
2012-2017 Change: No change

Thurso and North West Caithness
2017: 2 Independent, 1 Conservative, 1 SNP
2012-2017 Change: New ward

* = Sitting Councillors for Landward Caithness Ward.
+ = Sitting Councillors for Thurso Ward.

Wick and East Caithness
2017: 2 Independent, 1 Conservative, 1 SNP
2012-2017 Change: New ward

* = Sitting Councillors for Wick Ward.

+ = Sitting Councillor for Landward Caithness Ward.

East Sutherland and Edderton
2012: 1xLabour, 1xIndependent; 1xSNP
2017: 1 x Labour, 1 x Independent, 1 x Liberal Democrats
2012-2017 Change: 1 x Liberal Democrat gain from SNP

Wester Ross, Strathpeffer and Lochalsh
2012: 2 x Independent, 1 x SNP, 1 x Liberal Democrat
2017: 1 x Independent, 1 x SNP, 1 x Conservative, 1 x Liberal Democrat 
2012-2017 Change: 1 x Conservative gain from Independent

* = Sitting Councillor for Culloden and Ardersier Ward.

Cromarty Firth
2012: 2 x Independent, 1 x SNP, 1 x Liberal Democrats
2017: 2 x Independent, 2 x SNP
2012-2017 Change: 1 x SNP gain from Liberal Democrats

Tain and Easter Ross
2012: 2 x Independent, 1 x Liberal Democrat
2017: 1 x Independent, 1 x Liberal Democrat, 1 x SNP
2012-2017 Change: 1 x SNP gain from Independent

Dingwall and Seaforth
2012: 2 x Independent, 1 x Liberal Democrat, 1 x SNP
2017: 2 x Independent, 1 x Liberal Democrat, 1 x SNP
2012-2017 Change: No Change

Black Isle
2012: 2 x Independent, 1 x Liberal Democrats, 1 x SNP
2017: 1 x Independent, 1 x Liberal Democrats, 1 x SNP
2012-2017 Change: 1 x Independent loss due to 4 wards being reduced to 3

Eilean a' Cheò
2012: 2xIndependent; 1xLib Dem; 1xSNP
2017: 3xIndependent; 1xSNP
2012-2017 Change: Independent gain one seat from Lib Dem

 = Sitting Councillor for Inverness Millburn Ward.

Caol and Mallaig
2012: 3xIndependent
2017: 2xIndependent; 1xSNP
2012-2017 Change: SNP gain one seat from Independent

Aird and Loch Ness
2012: 2xIndependent; 1xSNP; 1xLib Dem
2017: 2xIndependent; 1xSNP; 1xCon
2012-2017 Change: Conservative gain one seat from Lib Dem

Inverness West
2012: 1xSNP; 1xLib Dem; 1xIndependent 
2017: 1xLib Dem; 1xIndependent; 1xSNP
2012-2017 Change: No change

Inverness Central
2012: 2xSNP; 1xIndependent; 1xLab
2017: 1xSNP; 1xLab; 1xIndependent
2012-2017 Change: 1 less seat compared to 2012.

Inverness Ness-side
2012: 1xLib Dem; 1xSNP; 1xIndependent; 1xLab
2017: 1xLib Dem; 1xSNP; 1xCon
2012-2017 Change: 1 less seat compared to 2012.

Inverness Millburn
2012: 1xLab; 1xSNP; 1xLib Dem
2017: 1xLab; 1xSNP; 1xCon
2012-2017 Change: Conservative gain one seat from Lib Dem

Culloden and Ardersier
2012: 1xSNP; 1xIndependent; 1xLab; 1xLib Dem
2017: 1xSNP; 1xIndependent; 1xLib Dem
2012-2017 Change: 1 less seat compared to 2012.

Nairn and Cawdor
2012: 2xIndependent; 2xSNP
2017: 2xIndependent; 1xSNP; 1xCon
2012-2017 Change: Conservative gain one seat from SNP.

Inverness South
2012: 2xLib Dem; 1xSNP; 1xIndependent
2017: 1SNP; 1Con; 1Lib Dem; 1Independent
2012-2017 Change: Conservative gain one seat from Lib Dem

Badenoch and Strathspey
2012: 2xSNP; 1xIndependent; 1xLib Dem
2017: 1xCon; 1xIndependent; 1xSNP; 1xGRN
2012-2017 Change: Conservative & Green each gain one seat from SNP & Liberal Democrat

Fort William and Ardnamurchan
2012: 2xIndependent; 1xSNP; 1xLab
2017: 2xSNP; 1xIndependent; 1xCon
2012-2017 Change: SNP & Conservative each gain one seat from Independent & Labour

Changes since 2017
† Tain and Easter Ross Liberal Democrat Cllr Jamie Stone was elected MP for Caithness, Sutherland and Easter Ross in June 2017. He resigned his council seat on 20 July 2017. The by-election took place on 28 September 2017. Alisdair Rhind was elected with 48.8% of the first preference vote. He had previously served as councillor for Tain and Easter Ross before losing his seat the previous May.
†† Inverness South Ken Gowans resigned from the SNP on 5 September 2017. He rejoined the SNP in 2018.
††† Eilean a' Cheò Cllr Calum MacLeod left the SNP group in November 2017 following allegations of fracas.
†††† Caol and Mallaig SNP Cllr Billy MacLachlan died in January 2018. A by-election took place on 5 April 2018. It was won by the Liberal Democrat candidate Denis Rixson, who had stood unsuccessfully for the seat in the 2017 local elections.
††††† Thurso and Northwest Caithness Independent Cllr Donnie Mackay left the independent-led administration in June 2018, in protest to a proposed roll-out of car park charges to more towns and toilet closures. He subsequently joined the Conservative party.
†††††† Wester Ross, Strathpeffer and Lochalsh Lib Dem Cllr Kate Stephen resigned her seat on 1 October 2018. This was due to an increase in her academic research. A by-election was held on 6 December 2018 which was won by the SNP's Alexander MacInnes.
††††††† Inverness Central SNP Cllr Richard Laird resigned his seat due to medical advice on 5 September 2019. A by-election was held on 14 November 2019 and Emma Roddick held the seat for the SNP.
†††††††† Eilean a' Cheò Independent Cllr Ronald MacDonald resigned his Council seat on 19 December 2019 to concentrate on the implementation of the Ritchie Report to improve Health and Social Care Services in Skye. A by-election was held on 12 March 2020 and was won by Independent candidate Calum Munro.
††††††††† Aird and Loch Ness Conservative Cllr George Cruikshank died on 6 April 2020. A by-election was held on 11 March 2021 and was won by Independent candidate David Fraser.
†††††††††† Cllr Andrew Baxter (Fort William and Ardnamurchan) was removed from the independent administration in the summer of 2020. He initially continued under the grouping "Real Independent", but has subsequently joined the Conservative group.
††††††††††† Three SNP members - Cllrs Maxine Smith & Pauline Munro (Cromarty Firth) and Cllr Liz MacDonald (Nairn and Cawdor) left the party on 17 September 2020 to continue as independents.
†††††††††††† By-elections were held on 12 August 2021 for the seats vacated by Cllr Nicola Sinclair (Wick and East Caithness) and Cllr Graham Ross (Inverness West). These were won by Jill Tilt and Colin Aitken respectively, both of the Scottish Liberal Democrats.
††††††††††††† A by-election was held on 2 December 2021 for the seat vacated by the sad death of Cllr Ian Ramon (Fort William and Ardnamurchan). The by-election was won by Sarah Fanet of the SNP.
†††††††††††††† Independent Cllr Ben Thompson (Caol and Mallaig) resigned on 12 November 2021. No by-election was called for this vacancy as the next full election of the council is expected within six months of his resignation date.

By-elections since 2017

Tain and Easter Ross

Caol and Mallaig

Wester Ross, Strathpeffer and Lochalsh

Inverness Central

Eilean a' Cheò

Aird and Loch Ness

Wick and East Caithness

Inverness West

Fort William and Ardnamurchan

References

highland council notice of poll

2017
2017 Scottish local elections